Alfons Zitterbacke is an East German film. It was released in 1966.

External links
 

1966 films
East German films
1960s German-language films
German children's films
Films based on children's books
Films based on German novels
1960s German films